The vice chief of staff of the Air Force (VCSAF) is the second-highest-ranking military officer in the United States Air Force. If the chief of staff of the Air Force (CSAF) is absent or is unable to perform his duties, then the VCSAF assumes the duties and responsibilities of the CSAF. The VCSAF may also perform other duties that the secretary of defense (SECDEF), the secretary of the Air Force (SECAF) or the CSAF assigns to him. The VCSAF is appointed by the president of the United States and must be confirmed via majority vote by the Senate. By statute, the VCSAF is appointed as a four-star general.

The current vice chief of staff of the Air Force is General David W. Allvin.

List of Vice Chiefs of Staff of the Air Force

Timeline

See also
Under Secretary of the Air Force
Chief Master Sergeant of the Air Force
Director of Staff of the United States Air Force
Vice Chief of Staff of the Army
Assistant Commandant of the Marine Corps
Vice Chief of Naval Operations
Vice Chief of Space Operations 
Vice Commandant of the Coast Guard

References

United States Air Force appointments
V
Vice chiefs of staff